Leopold Ernest Stratford George Canning, 4th Baron Garvagh,  (21 July 1878 – 16 July 1956) was a British nobleman, motorist, fighter pilot and politician, being the co-founder of the British Fascisti alongside Rotha Lintorn-Orman in 1923.

Biography
Canning was among the first motorists in Ireland – he imported a six hp Panhard to Ireland from France in 1898. Later he participated in several auto races using motor-powered tricycles. He was also among the founders of the Motor Cycle Union of Ireland and the Irish Automobile Club. Motoring Annual and Motorist’s Year Book 1904 records him owning four Ormonde motorcycles and having high hopes about the future of motor industry in Britain.

Canning became a lieutenant in the 2nd Battalion of the Highland Light Infantry and participated in the First World War. He later transferred to the Royal Flying Corps, having also been a founder member of the Aéro-Club de France. He reached the rank of lieutenant in the Royal Flying Corps as well, serving on the Salonica front.

On 8 January 1915 Canning's father died, and he succeeded him as Baron Garvagh.

In 1923, Canning co-founded the British Fascisti with Rotha Lintorn-Orman. Historian Robert Skidelsky characterized the British Fascisti as

Members of the new party, later known as British Fascists, included generals Ormonde Winter, Julian Tyndale-Biscoe, Roland Erskine-Tulloch, James Spens and Thomas Pilcher; admirals Edmund Fremantle, Reginald Tupper and William Ernest Russell Martin; Lieutenant Colonels Daniel Burges  and Edward Russell, as well as senior diplomat Arthur Henry Hardinge.

Canning was replaced as President of the British Fascists by Brigadier R. B. D. Blakeney  in 1924, as he claimed to live too far away from London to be effective as a leader.

In 1928 Canning became one of the first members of the Fellowship of Nineteenth Century Motorists.

Canning died on 16 July 1956 at the age of 77, and his title of Baron Garvagh passed on to his only surviving son Alexander Leopold Ivor George.

Family 
Canning was the great-grandson of George Canning, 1st Baron Garvagh, who was a first cousin of the short-time Prime Minister of the United Kingdom George Canning. His parents were Charles John Spencer George Canning and Florence Alice de Bretton.

Canning married for the first time in 1904 to Caroline Grace Elizabeth Rube, daughter of Charles Ernest Rube. The marriage was annulled in 1909 due to it not being consummated.

On 1 January 1919, Canning married for a second time to Gladys Dora May Dimmer (née Parker, 1895–1982) in St Matthew's, Bayswater. She was a widow of John Dimmer , who had been killed in action on 21 March 1918 in France. The couple had four children:

 Dora Valerie Patricia Canning (31 October 1919 – 17 May 2002), married Philip Anthony Wellesley-Clark, who was killed in action in the Normandy landings on 6 June 1944
 Alexander Leopold Ivor George Canning, 5th Baron Garvagh, (6 October 1920 – 31 October 2013)
 Daphne Rose Canning (born 16 December 1922)
 Lieutenant Victor Stratford de Redcliffe Canning (7 February 1924 – 7 May 1944), killed in action in Cassino, Italy

Footnotes

References

External links 

 Leopold Canning, 4th Baron Garvagh photographed in 1936 by Walter Stoneman, National Portrait Gallery

1878 births
1956 deaths
British World War I pilots
British fascists
Deputy Lieutenants of Londonderry
Irish justices of the peace
Highland Light Infantry officers
Royal Flying Corps officers
British Army personnel of World War I
Barons in the Peerage of Ireland
Members of the Aéro-Club de France